The Songshan Cultural and Creative Park (SSCC) is a multifunctional park in Xinyi District, Taipei, Taiwan.

History
The park was initially constructed in 1937 as a tobacco factory under the name  under the Japanese government. After Japan ceded Taiwan in 1945, the Taiwan Provincial Monopoly Bureau took over the factory and renamed it as the Songshan Tobacco Plant of the Taiwan Provincial Monopoly Bureau. In 1947, the plant was renamed again as Songshan Tobacco Plant of the Taiwan Tobacco and Wine Bureau.

The factory ceased to produce cigarettes in 1998 for concern over urban planning, tobacco and liquor marketing regulatory changes and the decline in tobacco demand.

In 2001, the Taipei City Government designed the defunct tobacco factory as Taipei's 99th historic site and converted it into a park comprising city-designated historic sites, historical structures and architectural highlights. Together with Taipei Dome, the site is known as Taipei Cultural and Sporting Complex.

For more efficient reuse of space, in 2011 the former factory was turned into a creative park by its current name to provide venues for diverse cultural and creative exhibitions and performances.

Purposes
The park has the following aims:

 Establish public platform and develop the cultural and creative industry;
 Cultivate culture and creativity and cross industry exchanges;
 Develop innovative experiments and set trends;
 Provide cultural and arts education and encourage public involvement;
 Spotlight the cultural and creative industry and put Taiwan on the map.

Features

The park consists of:

Warehouses
There are five warehouses, from number 1 until 5. The workers manufactured cigarettes on the second floor of the plant. After packaging the rolled cigarettes, the boxes were sent directly to warehouse no. 2 using conveyor channel, through the turntable, directed to the platforms for delivery, hence reducing manual labor.

Inspection Room
The inspection room served as the place for employees and officers had to pass through when reporting for or getting off work. It had stationed guards on duty.

Office Building

Taiwan Design

Taiwan Design Museum
The Taiwan Design Museum building used to house the office for supervisors and officers of the tobacco plant. The office had also conference rooms and rest areas for guests. Ordinary plant employees were not allowed to access the building.

Innovative Design Lab

Tobacco Factory
The tobacco factory consists of three segments, which are North, South and East. The building has characteristics of long open hallways with no dividing walls. The first floor mainly comprises columns to support the weight of the machines on the second floor.

Baroque Garden
Enclosed by the tobacco factory three sections, the garden has a fountain that is surrounded by sculptures of naked women emerging from their baths.

Machine Repair Plant
The machine repair plant building now houses the TMSK restaurant. The machine repair plant was exclusively responsible for the reparation and maintenance of the tobacco producing machines.

Boiler Room
The boiler room acted as the power source for the tobacco plant. Coal was burnt here to provide power for the plant. The chimneys were used to expel the smoke generated.

Nursery Room
There used to be 1,200 employees working at the plant at the same time. The tobacco plant had an industrial village concept, in which it included facilities such as cafeterias, shower facilities, dormitories, hospital, food mall, dining rooms, entertainment rooms and nursery. The nursery room served as a place for the infants of the employees to rest and play.

Ecology Pond
For fire extinguishing, ventilation and hydrosphere purposes, a large lotus pond was installed. It is now revamped as an ecology pond where children can enjoy the sounds of frogs and insects and experience the beauty of ecology.

West 201 Conference Room

SSCC Management Center

Taiwan Design Research Institute
The Taiwan Design Research Institute is a national design center established to promote the development of the cultural and creative industry in which it acts as the integrated platform to promote creative design. It was established in 2003 and become officially operational in 2004.

The main mission of TDC is to upgrade original creativity of Taiwanese designers, promote international design exchange, upgrade market competitiveness of Taiwanese industries, help enterprises build up their own brand, raise value-added of such industries and tell the world that the era of Designed in Taiwan has come.

TDC Information Center

Design Library

Creative Forum

Multi-Showcase Hall

Transportation
The park is accessible within walking distance northeast from Sun Yat-sen Memorial Hall Station or North West from Taipei City Hall Station of the Taipei Metro.

See also
 List of tourist attractions in Taiwan
 List of parks in Taiwan
 Taiwan Design Museum

References

External links

 

1937 establishments in Taiwan
Art centers in Taipei
Cultural centers in Taipei
Tobacco in Taiwan
Industrial buildings completed in 1937
Museum districts
History of tobacco
Tobacco buildings